Alfred Hill (1867 – 14 July 1945) was a British Labour Party politician. He sat in the House of Commons from 1922 to 1923 as the Member of Parliament (MP) for Leicester West.

At the 1922 general election, he won the Leicester West seat in a 3-way contest, defeating the sitting MP Joseph Frederick Green.
Green had been elected in 1918 general election as a National Democratic and Labour Party, but stood in 1922 as National Liberal candidate.

Hill did not stand again at the 1923 general election, when the seat was held for Labour by Frederick Pethick-Lawrence.

References

External links 
 

1867 births
1945 deaths
Labour Party (UK) MPs for English constituencies
National Union of Boot and Shoe Operatives-sponsored MPs
UK MPs 1922–1923